Nasa Q'ara (Aymara nasa nose, q'ara bare, bald, "bare-nosed", also spelled  Nasa Kara, Nasa Khara, Nasacara, Nasaqara, Nasaq'ara, Nazacara) may refer to:

 Nasa Q'ara, a mountain north of Allqa Quta in the Pucarani Municipality, Los Andes Province, La Paz Department, Bolivia
 Nasa Q'ara (Loayza), a mountain in the Loayza Province, La Paz Department, Bolivia
 Nasa Q'ara (Wawanaki), a mountain southwest of Allqa Quta near Wawanaki in the Pucarani Municipality, Los Andes Province, La Paz Department, Bolivia
 Nazacara, a village in the Ingavi Province, La Paz Department, Bolivia
 Nazacara de Pacajes, a village in the Pacajes Province, La Paz Department, Bolivia
 Nazacara de Pacajes Municipality, a municipality in the Pacajes Province, La Paz Department, Bolivia